The Estate is a novel by Isaac Bashevis Singer. The story continues the narratives of The Manor in telling the history of late-19th century Polish Jews.

References

1969 American novels
Novels by Isaac Bashevis Singer